Proskauer Rose LLP (formerly known as Proskauer, Rose, Goetz & Mendelsohn, LLP) is an international law firm headquartered in New York City. The firm was founded in 1875 and currently employs more than 800 attorneys in twelve offices worldwide.

Proskauer is known for its labor and employment, litigation, corporate, private equity, private investment funds, finance, and intellectual property law departments. The firm is often in the headlines for its sports law group and celebrity clientele. Proskauer has long been the primary outside law firm for the National Basketball Association (NBA). Proskauer is also considered one of America's preeminent employer side labor law firms with specialty in union avoidance, the practice of disrupting and combatting union organizing efforts in their client's workplaces.

Practice overview

Proskauer Rose is a full-service law firm, practicing in areas including corporate finance, private investment funds, mergers and acquisitions, real estate transactions, bankruptcy and reorganizations, taxation, litigation, trusts and estates, intellectual property, and labor and employment law. Its clients include participants in many industries, including chemicals, entertainment, financial services, health care, hospitality, information technology, insurance, internet, manufacturing, media and communications, pharmaceuticals, real estate investment, sports, and transportation.

Proskauer Rose is known for its sports law department, with clients including all four of the major sports leagues in the US and Canada (MLB, the NFL, the NHL, and the NBA). In December 2006, The Legal U.S. 500's annual ranking of the top law firms for corporate work singled Proskauer out for excellence in  private equity, international M&A, high-yield debt and hedge fund formation.

Offices

United States 
Proskauer's New York City office, located in Times Square, is its headquarters. In 2012, the firm was given Tier 1 rankings for its advertising law, appellate, arbitration, bankruptcy, litigation, corporate, criminal, ERISA, entertainment law, environmental, healthcare, insurance, labor and employment, patent, real estate, sports law, trademark, and trusts and estates practice groups.

Proskauer's second largest office is in Boston, where the firm has been referred to as "a powerhouse in the private equity world," for having one of the world's leading private investment fund law practices. The Boston office received Tier 1 rankings for its private investment fund, labor law, intellectual property, corporate finance, tax, and ERISA practice groups. Additionally, the firm's pro bono and government work is led by former Massachusetts Attorney General Scott Harshbarger. The firm's Boston office was also noted for representing Facebook, Inc. and Mark Zuckerberg during his company's legal fight with ConnectU.

The firm's Los Angeles office is known for its high-profile litigation, corporate, and private equity work, which included the representation of Ares Management and the Ontario Teachers' Pension Plan in their $1.65 billion acquisition of General Nutrition Centers. The firm's Washington DC office is known for its employee benefits and executive compensation, securities regulation and enforcement, healthcare, and labor groups. The firm's Chicago office is known primarily for its bankruptcy, healthcare, and insurance law practices. The New Orleans office  has strong niche practices of nationwide ERISA litigation and labor and employment law practices. The firm's Boca Raton office has a prominent wealth management and planning group for high-net-worth clients, along with significant labor and employment, tax, and corporate law groups.

International 

Proskauer's London office is the firm's largest location outside of the United States. In 2013, Chambers UK ranked its private equity group as one of the "best in the UK." The office also has highly rated tax, finance, and corporate practice groups. The firm's Paris office is known internationally for its labor and employment law practice, along with its competition and antitrust, merger control, EU common market law, and corporate law groups.

The firm's offices in China, located in Beijing and Hong Kong, are known for their work in sports law (e.g., NBA China), financing, mergers & acquisitions, reorganizations, going-private transactions, and structured finance, which often include cross border elements.

The firm's Latin American presence is centered in São Paulo, Brazil. The firm's Latin America practice is highly regarded, representing clients, such as Banco Itaú-BBA, Banco Votorantim, WestLB, Banco Santander, Votorantim Group, CSN, the Abril Group, and TV Band. The Latin American team notably represented Banco BTG Pactual US Capital Corp. (and other underwriters) in the establishment by Banco BTG Pactual S.A. of a $3 billion Global Medium Term Note Program and issue of $500 million senior notes with BTG Pactual US Capital Corp. as arranger and BTG Pactual US Capital Corp., JP Morgan and Bradesco BBI as underwriters, as well as Iochpe-Maxion, a publicly traded Brazilian auto parts and railway equipment manufacturer, in the acquisition of Michigan-based Hayes Lemmerz International, Inc. for approximately $725 million.

Proskauer's pro bono efforts in Iraq serves as an example of the firm's international efforts to assist Iraqi and other families, who are threatened as a result of their association with American and coalition forces, to find safety in the United States.

History
Throughout its history, the firm's headquarters has been located in the area of Times Square, in midtown Manhattan, where it grew from fewer than a dozen lawyers originally to nearly 800. A full-service practice, it is currently among the ten largest law firms in New York City.

William R. Rose started the firm that is now Proskauer Rose when, at 21 years of age, he opened a law firm on Broadway in Downtown Manhattan in 1875. In 1907, Rose promoted associate Benjamin Paskus to partner and renamed the firm Rose & Paskus.  Rose & Paskus was one of the first firms to develop a specialized tax practice after the passage of the Sixteenth Amendment to the United States Constitution in 1913. In 1930, Judge Joseph M. Proskauer resigned his position on New York's Appellate Division to join the firm, which was then renamed Proskauer, Rose & Paskus. The firm shortened its name to Proskauer Rose in 1997.

Proskauer Rose is historically known as a "Jewish law firm" for its willingness to cross traditional historic and cultural hiring norms that other major New York City law firms were unwilling to do at the time.  Because of its willingness to employ Jewish lawyers, Proskauer is not known as a traditional "white shoe" law firm, though over the past quarter-century  it has gained the reputation as one of the "new white shoe" law firms.  Thus it cannot rely on long-standing ties to old money or big investment banks. Rather, the firm has historically focused its practice on labor and employment law, as well as building up significant litigation, health care, sports and entertainment, bankruptcy, and taxation practices.

In December 2004, a large group of lawyers from the  Boston-based law firm of Testa, Hurwitz & Thibeault joined the Boston office of Proskauer Rose.

Revenue and profitability

In February 2012, Proskauer Rose increased its gross revenue by 6.4 percent to $686 million and its average profits per partner 9 percent to $1.7 million, according to The American Lawyer's reporting. In 2013, Proskauer Rose again increased its revenue by more than 7%, to over $700 million.   These figures place Proskauer Rose as one of the fastest growing law firms in the United States. The firm's robust financial performance came amid a busy year for office moves. The most significant shuffle saw Proskauer move its New York headquarters to 11 Times Square in January, 2011. With more than 400,000 square feet of space spread across 14 floors, the firm is the new building's anchor tenant—with its name splashed across the facade in a 40-foot-by-10-foot backlit sign. Proskauer Rose saw gross revenue of $1.17 billion in 2021, up from $990 million in 2020.

Pro bono
In 2012, Proskauer argued before the U.S. Supreme Court in a ruling  that the Fair Sentencing Act of 2010 (FSA), which reduced the disparity in federal sentencing between crack and powder cocaine offenses, applies to defendants who were sentenced after its passage even though their offenses pre-dated the law. The firm is also noted for hosting an Election Protection call center during every election cycle since the 2012 Presidential election.

In 2010, Proskauer received the Law Firm Pro Bono Award at the William O. Douglas Award Dinner in Los Angeles, sponsored by Public Counsel, the United States' largest pro bono public interest law firm. 

In 2019, Proskauer was named to The National Law Journal's "Pro Bono Hot List."

Ranking and awards
According to a study by Yale Law Women (co-sponsored by women's law groups at Stanford, Harvard, Columbia, Chicago, Berkeley, Northwestern, and Virginia), Proskauer Rose ranked second in their list of top ten family-friendly firms of 2007.

In 2007, Proskauer Rose was named among the top United States firms practicing corporate and finance law in The Legal 500 US Volume I: Corporate & Finance, a ranking of the "best of the best" U.S. law firms.  Proskauer was named a leader in the following categories: Private Equity; International Mergers and Acquisitions; Capital Markets; Investment Funds - Alternative/Hedge Fund Formation.

In 2008, Proskauer was named the fastest-growing law firm for the third consecutive year in Boston Business Journal's annual ranking of the area's 100 largest law firms. With the addition of 25 lawyers since January 2007 - a 30-percent growth rate - the firm is ranked 17th in the year' survey.

Fifteen lawyers from Proskauer Rose were  named in Southern California Super Lawyers 2008, an annual guide to the top lawyers in the region (the firm was represented in 10 different practice areas).  Selections for Southern California Super Lawyers are based on peer nominations and independent research by the editors of Law & Politics magazine.

Proskauer Rose received the 2003 Special Award of Merit by the New York Women's Bar Association for its contribution to the advancement of women.

In 2022, Proskauer Rose was the winner of the 18th British Private Equity Award and awarded 'Law Firm of the Year for Structuring'.

Notable clients and cases
Proskauer Rose represented Silverstein Properties, owner of the World Trade Center towers in New York that were destroyed by the terrorist attack on September 11, 2001, in a dispute with its insurers.
The firm won a copyright case in 2006 when they represented the rock band The White Stripes against a former producer regarding the ownership rights in the band's first two albums.
The firm represented the League of American Theatres and Producers during the stagehands strike in the fall of 2007.
The Association of Community Organizations for Reform Now (ACORN) hired Proskauer in 2009 to conduct an investigation into its operations and write a report regarding the undercover video controversy.
In 2015, Last Week Tonight host John Oliver employed the firm to purchase a $9.5million Manhattan penthouse using several shell companies set up on his behalf by the firm, taking advantage of a tax loophole called 421-a to reduce his property tax bill by as much as $300,000.
In 2017, Proskauer Rose represented Celgene in its $9 billion acquisition of cancer drug maker Juno Therapeutics.
In 2019, Proskauer Rose represented the Big East Conference as it readmitted the University of Connecticut back to the Big East.

Notable alumni
 Gary Bettman, Commissioner of the National Hockey League
 Lloyd Blankfein, CEO of Goldman Sachs
 David Braun, music industry lawyer, former lawyer of Bob Dylan and president of Polygram Records
 Michael A. Cardozo, former President of the New York City Bar Association
 Robert A. Gorman (born 1937), law professor at the University of Pennsylvania Law School
 Sylvan Gotshal, co-founder of Weil, Gotshal & Manges
 David Kahn, President of basketball operations for the Minnesota Timberwolves
 Steven C. Krane, partner and general counsel
 Doug Perlman, founder of Sports Media Advisors
 Moose Scheib, founder and CEO of LoanMod.com
 David Stern, Commissioner of the National Basketball Association
 Frank Weil, co-founder of Weil, Gotshal & Manges
 Joseph M. Proskauer, New York Supreme Court judge and name partner of the firm

See also
List of largest United States-based law firms by profits per partner

References

External links

Proskauer Rose organizational profile at the National Law Review.

 
Law firms based in New York City
Law firms established in 1875